High Green is a suburb of the English city of Sheffield.

It may also refer to the following, also in England:
High Green, Cumbria
High Green, Norfolk
High Green, Shropshire
High Green, Suffolk
High Green, West Yorkshire
High Green, Worcestershire